Erman Yıldırım (born 26 February 1986) is a Turkish former professional footballer who played as a defender.

Yıldırım was a youth product of Gaziantepspor and Fenerbahçe. He a was part of the Fenerbahçe squad that won 6–0 against Galatasaray on 6 November 2002, their record win over their rivals. He spent the rest of his career in various professional and semi-professional clubs in Turkey. He represented Turkey as a youth international 49 times.

References

External links
 
 
 Mackolik Profile

1986 births
Living people
People from İzmir
Turkish footballers
Turkey youth international footballers
Association football defenders
Fenerbahçe S.K. footballers
Antalyaspor footballers
Mardinspor footballers
Adana Demirspor footballers
Akhisarspor footballers
Yeni Malatyaspor footballers
Süper Lig players
TFF First League players
TFF Second League players